Orhan Taşanlar is a Turkish civil servant. He was a chief of police and a regional governor.

Biography
He was Istanbul Chief of Police (2 November 1995 - 18 April 1996) and then Governor of Bursa Province (23 April 1996 - 30 September 1999). He had a close relationship with businessman Erol Evcil.

He was also Ankara Chief of Police.

References

Living people
Turkish police chiefs
Governors of Bursa
Year of birth missing (living people)